Biko may refer to:

People
 Adolfo Obiang Biko (born 1940), Equatorial Guinea politician
 Hlumelo Biko (born 1978), South African businessman
 Steve Biko (1946–1977), anti-apartheid activist in South Africa

 Biko Adema (born 1987) Kenyan rugby player
 Biko Agozino (born 1961) Nigerian criminologist
 Biko Bradnock-Brennan (born 1992) Irish-British soccer player
 Biko Brazil (born 1982) Dutch soccer player
 Biko Botowamungu (born 1957) Congelese Austrian boxer

Fictional characters
 Biko Daitokuji (大徳寺 美子; だいとくじ びこ; B-ko), a fictional character from Project A-ko
 Biko Pegasus (ビコーペガサス; Bikō Pegasasu), a fictional character from Uma Musume Pretty Derby

Places
 Biko (restaurant), a Basque restaurant in Mexico City
 Biko, Santa Barbara Student Housing Cooperative, University of California at Santa Barbara, Santa Barbara, California, USA; a student residence
 Steve Biko Academic Hospital, Pretoria, South Africa
 Steve Biko Building, University of Manchester Students' Union, University of Manchester, Manchester, England, UK

Groups, companies, and organizations
 Steve Biko Foundation, a South African community development organization
 Steve Biko Artillery Regiment, South African Artillery, South Africa
 Steve Biko FC, Bakau, Gambia; a soccer team

Media and entertainment
 Bikō (尾行; びこう; "Tail"), an eroge video game series by Illusion

Music
 "Biko" (song), 1980 song about Steve Biko written by Peter Gabriel
 "Mr. Biko" (song), a 1980 song by Chet Baker and Wolfgang Lackerschmid off the self-titled eponymous album Chet Baker / Wolfgang Lackerschmid

Literature
 Biko (book), 1978 biography of Steve Biko by Donald Woods
 "Glimmer" (微光, Bikō), a serialized chapter of Tokyo Goul

Other uses
 Biko (food), a type of sweet rice cake from the Philippines
 Biko (horse), a Thoroughbred

See also

 Beko, a home appliances brand
 Bico (disambiguation)
 
Surnames of South African origin

Kenyan given names